Zukanović is a Bosnian surname. Notable people with the surname include:

Ervin Zukanović (born 1987), Bosnian footballer
Ibrahim Zukanović (born 1957), Bosnian footballer
Miloš Zukanović (born 1996), Serbian footballer

Bosnian surnames
Slavic-language surnames
Patronymic surnames